The Hassan Moustafa Sports Hall is a multi-purpose arena in 6th of October City, Cairo, Egypt.

History
The hall was opened in 2020 as the 6 October Sports Hall. It was constructed to serve as one of the venue for the 2021 World Men's Handball Championship in Egypt. In December 2020, Egyptian Ministry of Youth and Sports renamed the hall as Dr. Hassan Moustafa Sports Hall in recognition of the efforts of International Handball Federation President Dr. Hassan Moustafa to promote Egyptian sport globally.

On December 24, 2022, during the Egypt Basketball Super Cup between Al Ahly and Al Ittihad, a stand in the arena partly collapsed, injuring 27 people.

Events
The hall hosted as venue for the 2021 World Men's Handball Championship. In 2022, the hall will host the 2022 FIBA Intercontinental Cup, which will be the first time the competition is held in an African country. Additionally, the regular season of the 2022 season of the Basketball Africa League (BAL) will be hosted at the arena.

References

Indoor arenas in Egypt
Handball venues in Egypt
Sports venues in Cairo
Sports venues completed in 2020
2020 establishments in Egypt
21st-century architecture in Egypt